René David (January 12, 1906 in Jura, France – May 26, 1990 in Le Tholonet, France) was a French Professor of Law. His work has been published in eight different languages. He was, in the second half of the 20th century, one of the key representatives in the field of comparative law.

Biography
Between 1929 and 1939 David was a professor at the University of Grenoble. During World War II he served in the French army. After the war, from 1945 to 1968, he was the chair of comparative law at the Faculty of Law of Paris (University of Paris). Subsequently, from 1968 to 1976 he was a professor at the University of Aix-en-Provence.

He worked on several legal projects and assignments, as in 1930 for UNIDROIT (International Institute for the Unification of Private Law) in Rome. He lectured in various places in the world, including the University of Cambridge (1933–35), Columbia University, the Ludwig Maximilian University of Munich and the University of Tehran.

In the sixties, he led the French delegation at the UNCITRAL (United Nations Commission on International Trade Law) and from 1962 to 1978 he was a board member of UNIDROIT. David was one of the writers of the Civil Code of Ethiopia in 1960 and a member of the team that wrote the civil law for Rwanda. He was also, in 1973, the head of the publication of the International Encyclopaedia of Comparative Law.

Legal theory
David, in Traité élémentaire de droit civile comparé, proposed the classification of legal systems, according to the different ideology inspiring each one, into five groups or families:
 Western Laws, a group subdivided into the:
 Romano-Germanic subgroup (comprising those legal systems where legal science was formulated according to Roman Law – see also Civil law (legal system))
 Anglo-Saxon subgroup (common law)
 Soviet Law
 Muslim Law (sharia)
 Hindu Law
 Chinese Law
 Jewish Law (halakha)

Especially with respect to the aggregating by David of the Romano-Germanic and Anglo-Saxon Laws into a single family, David argued that the antithesis between the Anglo-Saxon Laws and Romano-German Laws, is of a technical rather than of an ideological nature. Of a different kind is, for instance, the antithesis between (say) the Italian and the American Law, and of a different kind that between the Soviet, Muslim, Hindu, or Chinese Law. According to David, the Romano-Germanic legal systems included those countries where legal science was formulated according to Roman Law, whereas common law countries are those where law was created from the judges. The characteristics that he believed uniquely differentiate the Western legal family from the other four are:
 liberal democracy
 capitalist economy
 Christian religion

Awards

David was awarded honorary degrees from the University of Edinburgh, Brussels, Ottawa, Basel, Leicester and Helsinki.

On September 17, 1976, he was honored with Amnesty International, with the Erasmus Prize in the Pieterskerk in Leiden.

Selected bibliography 
 1929: La protection des minorités dans les sociétés par actions, Librairie du Recueil Sirey, Paris
 1947: Cours de législation civile, Les cours de droit, Paris
 1948: Introduction à l'étude du droit privé de l'Angleterre, Recueil Sirey, Paris
 1950: Traité élémentaire de droit civil comparé: introduction à l'étude des droits étrangers et à la méthode comparative, R. Pichon, R. Durand-Auzias, Paris
 1952: French bibliographical digest. Law: books and periodicals, culturele afdeling van de Franse ambassade, New York
 1954: Le droit soviétique, met John N Hazard, Librairie générale de droit et de jurisprudence, Paris, 2 volumes
 1955: French law, Diocesan press, Madras
 1958: The French legal system: an introduction to civil law systems, met Henry P De Vries, Oceana Publications for Parker School of Foreign and Comparative Law, Columbia University, New York
 1960: Le Droit français, met Philippe Ardant, Librairie générale de droit et de jurisprudence, Paris
 1960: Le droit français. Principes et tendances du droit français,  Libr. générale de droit et de jurisprudence, Paris
 1962: Cours de droit civil comparé, Les Cours de droit, Paris
 1964 Les grands systèmes de droit contemporains, Dalloz, Paris, 
 1964: Bibliographie du droit français, 1945-1960, établie pour le Comité international pour la documentation des sciences sociales sous le patronage de l'Association internationale des sciences juridiques, met  International Committee for Social Sciences Documentation,  	Paris, Mouton
 1967: Administrative contracts in the Ethiopian civil code, Ministerie van Justitie, Addis Ababa
 1968: Major legal systems in the world today, met John E. C. Brierley, London
 1972: French law; its structure, sources, and methodology, State University Press, Baton Rouge, 
 1973: Les Contrats en droit anglais, met Françoise Grivart de Kerstrat,  Libr. de Droit et de Jurisprudence R. Pichon et R. Durand-Auzias, Paris
 1974: Structure and the divisions of the law, M. Nijhoff, Den Haag
 1975: International encyclopedia of comparative law, met International Association of Legal Science, M. Nijhoff, Den Haag, 
 1977: Unification du droit et arbitrage, Kluwer, Deventer, 
 1980: English law and French law: a comparison in substance, Stevens and Sons, London, 
 1982: Le droit comparé: droits d´hier, droitss de demain, Paris, 
 1982: Les avatars d´un com-paratiste, Paris, 
 1987: Le droit du commerce international: réflexions d´un comparatiste sur le droit international privé, Paris, 
 1995: Le droit anglais, met Xavier Blanc-Jouvan, Presses universitaires de France, Paris,

References

 Info Pressa (2011) Rene David, One of the Most Prominent Scholars in the Field of Comparative Law
 Revue internationale de droit comparé  lien (1976) La remise du Prix Erasme au professeur René David, vol. 28, number 4, page 803
 Revue internationale de droit comparé  lien (1990) René David (1906-1990), vol. 42, number 3, pages 865-868
 IDREF, bibliography

French legal scholars
Academic staff of the University of Paris
1906 births
1990 deaths
Corresponding Fellows of the British Academy